Galanti is a surname. Notable people with the surname include:

Giuseppe Maria Galanti (1743–1806), Italian historian and economist
Omar Galanti (born 1973), Italian pornographic actor
Paul Galanti (1939–2014), American Vietnam War veteran
Yitzhak Galanti (1937–2012), Israeli politician